Ari Leifsson (born 19 April 1998) is an Icelandic footballer who plays as a defender for Strømsgodset and the Iceland national team.

Career
Ari made his international debut for Iceland on 19 January 2020 in a friendly match against El Salvador, which finished as a 1–0 win.

Career statistics

International

References

External links
 
 
 
 

1998 births
Living people
Ari Leifsson
Ari Leifsson
Ari Leifsson
Association football defenders
Ari Leifsson
Ari Leifsson
Ari Leifsson
Strømsgodset Toppfotball players
Eliteserien players
Ari Leifsson
Expatriate footballers in Norway
Ari Leifsson